Newark City Hall is located at Government Center in Newark in Essex County, New Jersey. The building was built in 1902 and was added to the National Register of Historic Places on February 17, 1978.

History
The building is a five-story Beaux Arts style building with a golden dome; built at a cost of $2.6 million. The interior of the building features carved marble, a grand central staircase, stained-glass skylights, decorative plaster and wrought-iron works. Developer Harry Grant paid to have the dome covered in 24 carat gold in 1986. The building was renovated in 2006 at a cost of $18 Million.

See also
National Register of Historic Places listings in Essex County, New Jersey
Four Corners (Newark)

References

External links

City of Newark official website

Beaux-Arts architecture in New Jersey
Buildings and structures in Newark, New Jersey
City and town halls in New Jersey
City and town halls on the National Register of Historic Places in New Jersey
Government buildings completed in 1902
National Register of Historic Places in Newark, New Jersey
New Jersey Register of Historic Places